Robert Strong may refer to:
Robert C. Strong (1915–1999), American diplomat
Robert William Strong Sr. (1890–1975), brigadier general, Chief of Staff for the U.S. Army Forces in Africa during World War II
Robert William Strong Jr. (1917–2006), major general, Chief of Staff for the Eighth Air Force from 1966 to 1970
 Robert Strong, a fictional knight introduced by Qyburn in George R. R. Martin's fantasy novel A Storm of Swords (2000)

See also
Robert the Strong (died 866), father of two kings of West Francia